Rutherford is a borough in Bergen County, in the U.S. state of New Jersey. As of the 2020 United States census, the borough's population was 18,834, an increase of 773 (+4.3%) from the 2010 census count of 18,061, which in turn reflected a decline of 49 (−0.3%) from the 18,110 counted in the 2000 census.

Rutherford was formed as a borough by an act of the New Jersey Legislature on September 21, 1881, from portions of Union Township, based on the results of a referendum held on the previous day. The borough was named for John Rutherfurd, a U.S. Senator who owned land in the area.

Rutherford has been called the "Borough of Trees" and "The First Borough of Bergen County", and is known as well for its pedestrian-focused downtown area adjacent to the borough's Bergen Line (New Jersey Transit) railway station.

History
The ridge above the New Jersey Meadowlands upon which Rutherford sits was settled by Lenape Native Americans long before the arrival of Walling Van Winkle in 1687. Union Avenue, which runs from the Meadowlands to the Passaic River, may have been an Indian trail, but was more likely a property boundary line; it was referenced in the 1668 grant of land by proprietary Governor Philip Carteret to John Berry.

During the early days of settlement, the land that is now Rutherford was part of New Barbadoes Township, as Berry had lived in Barbados, another English colony, before claiming his grant in New Jersey. New Barbadoes was part of Essex County from 1693 to 1710, when Bergen County was formed. In 1826, the land became part of Lodi Township (of which today's remaining portion is now South Hackensack). When Hudson County was formed in 1840, the area that is today North Arlington, Lyndhurst, Rutherford and East Rutherford became part of Harrison Township (of which today's remaining portion is Harrison town). However, the area reverted to Bergen County in 1852 and became known as Union Township.

Part of the region was known as Boiling Springs for a powerful and ceaseless spring located in the vicinity. Despite its name, the spring actually consisted of cold groundwater seeps rather than hot springs.

The Erie Railroad built its Main Line from Jersey City across the Meadowlands in the 1840s. Daniel Van Winkle, a descendant of Walling, donated land in 1866 for a train station at Boiling Springs. Several resorts were built along the Passaic, with guests disembarking at Boiling Springs station and taking Union Avenue to the river. Later, the railroad opened a station closer to the river, at Carlton Hill, and a horsecar line (briefly on rails) along Jackson Ave took travelers to the resort area.

At the time, much of the property in Rutherford was farmland owned by the estate of John Rutherfurd, a former New Jersey legislator and U.S. Senator, whose homestead was along the Passaic River, near present-day Rutherford Avenue. Van Winkle opened a real estate office at Depot Square (now Station Square) to sell the land of the Rutherfurd Park Association, and began to lay out the area's street grid. The main roads were Orient Way, a wide boulevard heading south-southwest from Station Square, and Park Avenue, which headed west-southwest from Station Square to bring traffic to the new Valley Brook Race Course in what is now Lyndhurst.

In the 1870s, the area began to be called "Rutherford". The definitive reason for the change in spelling of the final syllable from "furd" to "ford" is unknown, though the change may have been the result of name recognition of the Ohio politician Rutherford B. Hayes, who was elected President in 1876, or could have been because of a clerical error by the United States Postal Service. The Post Office opened a facility called "Rutherford" in 1876. On September 21, 1881, the Borough of Rutherford was formed by formal vote of secession from Union Township. By then, the community had about 1,000 residents.

Historic sites
Rutherford is home to the following locations on the National Register of Historic Places:
 Iviswold – 223 Montross Avenue (added 2004). Located on the campus of Felician College, a $9 million renovation project of the Iviswold castle that took 14 years was completed in 2013.
 Kip Homestead – 12 Meadow Road (added 1983).
 Rutherford station – Station Square (added 1984). New Jersey Transit initiated a $1 million project in 2009 to renovate the station, which had been constructed in 1898, to restore the interior of the structure.
 William Carlos Williams House – 9 Ridge Road (added 1973).
 Yereance-Berry House – 91 Crane Avenue (added 1983).

Geography
According to the United States Census Bureau, the borough had a total area of 2.89 square miles (7.49 km2), including 2.78 square miles (7.20 km2) of land and 0.11 square miles (0.29 km2) of water (3.88%).

The borough is bounded by the Passaic River bordering Clifton and Passaic in Passaic County to the west, the Erie Railroad bordering East Rutherford to the north and east, the Hackensack River bordering Secaucus to the southeast, and Berrys Creek, Wall Street West and Rutherford Avenue bordering Lyndhurst to the south and southwest.

Demographics

2020 census
As of the 2020 Census, Rutherford borough had a population of 18,834 with 6,835 households.

Of that population, 71.3% was white, 2.3% was black or African American, 0.2% was American Indian and Alaska Native, 16.2% was Asian, 7.7% was two or more races, and 22.7% was Hispanic or Latino.

Of the total population, 50.6% were female. There were 455 veterans living in the borough and 24.5% were foreign born persons.

The median household income was $106,817 with a per capita income of $48,764. 5.8% of the population lived beneath the poverty threshold.

95.0% of persons 25 years and older had a high school diploma, or more. And 51.9% of persons 25 years and older had a bachelor's degree or higher. 94.1% of the households had a computer and 89.8% had a broadband internet subscription.

2010 census

The Census Bureau's 2006–2010 American Community Survey showed that (in 2010 inflation-adjusted dollars) median household income was $85,783 (with a margin of error of +/− $4,632) and the median family income was $104,293 (+/− $6,102). Males had a median income of $70,071 (+/− $8,275) versus $55,080 (+/− $4,045) for females. The per capita income for the borough was $41,662 (+/− $3,383). About 3.6% of families and 4.6% of the population were below the poverty line, including 4.5% of those under age 18 and 5.3% of those age 65 or over.

Same-sex couples headed 65 households in 2010, an increase from the 48 counted in 2000.

2000 census
As of the 2000 United States census there were 18,110 people, 7,055 households, and 4,670 families residing in the borough. The population density was 6,451.7 people per square mile (2,488.4/km2). There were 7,214 housing units at an average density of 2,570.0 per square mile (991.2/km2). The racial makeup of the borough was 81.99% White, 2.70% African American, 0.04% Native American, 11.34% Asian, 0.03% Pacific Islander, 1.86% from other races, and 2.03% from two or more races. Hispanic or Latino of any race were 8.59% of the population.

There were 7,055 households, out of which 28.8% had children under the age of 18 living with them, 53.5% were married couples living together, 9.2% had a female householder with no husband present, and 33.8% were non-families. 28.3% of all households were made up of individuals, and 10.7% had someone living alone who was 65 years of age or older. The average household size was 2.52 and the average family size was 3.16.

In the borough the population was spread out, with 20.8% under the age of 18, 7.4% from 18 to 24, 32.6% from 25 to 44, 24.6% from 45 to 64, and 14.6% who were 65 years of age or older. The median age was 39 years. For every 100 females, there were 92.4 males. For every 100 females age 18 and over, there were 90.3 males.

The median income for a household in the borough was $63,820, and the median income for a family was $78,120. Males had a median income of $51,376 versus $39,950 for females. The per capita income for the borough was $30,495. About 2.3% of families and 3.7% of the population were below the poverty line, including 3.1% of those under age 18 and 6.9% of those age 65 or over.

Economy
Rutherford is the site of Architectural Window Manufacturing Corporation's plant and Blue Foundry Bank's (formerly Boiling Springs Savings Bank) corporate headquarters.

Rutherford, together with Lyndhurst and North Arlington, was the site of the EnCap project, an effort to remediate landfills on the  site and construct homes and golf courses on top of the remediated site. On May 27, 2008, the New Jersey Meadowlands Commission terminated its agreement with EnCap Golf Holdings, the company that had the contract to redevelop the site, after the company had missed targets to clean up the landfills as part of the project.

The Highland Cross Development is a proposed project that is to consist of 800 units of housing, including 160 affordable units, two hotels and a large retail component. Rutherford officials have been working to get approval for the project in the face of opposition from the 14 mayors of the Hackensack Meadowlands Municipal Committee.

Arts and culture
William Carlos Williams, the Pulitzer Prize–winning poet who died in 1963, was born in Rutherford in 1883. For most of his adult life, he maintained a physician's office in the house in which he lived, at 9 Ridge Road, at the corner of Park Avenue, even as he continued his artistic endeavors.

The Rivoli Theatre was opened in 1922 as a vaudeville house but was quickly converted into a movie palace. It was known for a large crystal chandelier suspended from the center of the auditorium. On January 9, 1977, the Rivoli was severely damaged in a fire. Soon afterward, a plan was developed to restore the Rivoli and turn it into a performing arts center. The William Carlos Williams Center for the Performing Arts opened in 1981 and contains three movie screens as well as two performance halls. Since 1995, the Williams Center's primary focus has been on concerts, ballet, opera, and theater for children.

The Meadowlands Museum, which focuses on local history and began as a project of parents of children in the public schools in 1961 and was originally based in a room at Sylvan School, moved to the Yereance-Berry House at 91 Crane Avenue in 1974.

The GFWC Woman's Club of Rutherford is a non-profit volunteer organization that was organized in 1889. The club is located in the former Iviswold carriage house.

The Rutherford Community Band was founded in 1941 and performs free concerts at venues throughout the borough, including the Hutzel Memorial Band Shell in Lincoln Park.

Annual cultural events
Rutherford holds an annual street fair on Labor Day which is the longest running street fair in New Jersey and usually attracts 20,000 people.

The first annual Rutherford West End Festival was held October 3, 2009, in the West End section of town.

The Rutherford Multicultural Festival is an annual event that provides traditional entertainment and food from around the world.

In 2017, the first annual Rutherford Downhill Derby provided kids and adults with the opportunity to design, build and race gravity powered race carts.

In 2018, the Rutherford Pride Alliance was founded.  A year later, the Rutherford council unanimously approved of raising the LGBTQ flag to celebrate the 50th anniversary of Stonewall.

Parks and recreation
Rutherford Memorial Park, in the northwest corner of town along the Passaic, was set aside as parkland by the voters in 1951. Its  include two baseball diamonds, five softball diamonds, a Little League Baseball field, a football stadium, six tennis courts, two basketball courts, and three playgrounds. Other active recreation parks include Tamblyn Field, near Route 3.

The borough also has several smaller passive parks, including Lincoln Park across from borough hall, which was renovated in 2004. It includes a band shell and several monuments, including a cannon dating to the Spanish–American War, and is home to the borough's 9/11 memorial, containing a piece of steel debris recovered from the site of the attacks. Sunset Park is located just north of the intersection of Union and Jackson Avenues and is on the western-facing side of a rather steep hill. A plan to redesign the park is currently being developed. Firefighters' Memorial Park is a pocket park located at the intersection of Park and Mortimer Avenues.

Lincoln Park has been host to town events, concerts, and memorials for decades. The Rutherford Community Band plays concerts during the summer. Other summer concerts are sponsored by the borough, as well as several movie nights in the park. In the fall, it has hosted the Bergen County Cultural Festival, which is funded and run by the Civil Rights Commission.

The Nereid Boat Club occupies a former boat sales building on the Passaic, at the foot of Newell Avenue. The rowing club, established in Nutley in 1875, relocated to Rutherford in 1996.

Government

Local government
Rutherford is governed under the Borough form of New Jersey municipal government, which is used in 218 municipalities (of the 564) statewide, making it the most common form of government in New Jersey. The governing body is comprised of a Mayor and a Borough Council, with all positions elected at-large on a partisan basis as part of the November general election. A Mayor is elected directly by the voters to a four-year term of office. The Borough Council is comprised of six members elected to serve three-year terms on a staggered basis, with two seats coming up for election each year in a three-year cycle. The Borough form of government used by Rutherford is a "weak mayor / strong council" government in which council members act as the legislative body with the mayor presiding at meetings and voting only in the event of a tie. The mayor can veto ordinances subject to an override by a two-thirds majority vote of the council. The mayor makes committee and liaison assignments for council members, and most appointments are made by the mayor with the advice and consent of the council. The Borough operates with numerous committees to assist the government in carrying out its responsibilities. In addition to statutory bodies such as the planning board and zoning board of adjustment, dozens of volunteers staff other committees appointed annually, providing recommendations to the council.

, the Mayor of the Borough of Rutherford is Democrat Frank Nunziato, whose term of office ends December 31, 2023. Members of the Rutherford Borough Council are Council President Stephanie McGowan (D, 2023), Maria Begg-Roberson (D, 2024), Matthew Cokeley (D, 2023), Christie Del Rey-Cone (D, 2025), Raymond L. Guzmán (D, 2024), and Susan E. Quatrone (D, 2025).

In November 2019, the Borough Council selected Raymond Guzman from a list of three candidates nominated by the Democratic municipal committee to complete the term expiring in December 2020 that had been held by Frank Nunziato until he resigned from his council seat to take office as mayor.

Federal, state and county representation
Rutherford is located in the 9th Congressional District and is part of New Jersey's 36th state legislative district.

Politics
As of March 2011, there were a total of 10,609 registered voters in Rutherford, of which 3,436 (32.4% vs. 31.7% countywide) were registered as Democrats, 2,287 (21.6% vs. 21.1%) were registered as Republicans and 4,875 (46.0% vs. 47.1%) were registered as Unaffiliated. There were 11 voters registered as Libertarians or Greens. Among the borough's 2010 Census population, 58.7% (vs. 57.1% in Bergen County) were registered to vote, including 74.3% of those ages 18 and over (vs. 73.7% countywide).

In the 2016 presidential election, Democrat Hillary Clinton received 4.796 votes (54.0% vs. 54.2% countywide), ahead of Republican Donald Trump with 3.681 votes (41.4% vs. 41.1%) and other candidates with 405 votes (4.6% vs. 4.6%), among the 8,978 ballots cast by the borough's 11,661 registered voters, for a turnout of 77.0% (vs. 72.5% in Bergen County). In the 2012 presidential election, Democrat Barack Obama received 4,771 votes (57.7% vs. 54.8% countywide), ahead of Republican Mitt Romney with 3,313 votes (40.1% vs. 43.5%) and other candidates with 111 votes (1.3% vs. 0.9%), among the 8,266 ballots cast by the borough's 11,229 registered voters, for a turnout of 73.6% (vs. 70.4% in Bergen County). In the 2008 presidential election, Democrat Barack Obama received 4,824 votes (53.7% vs. 53.9% countywide), ahead of Republican John McCain with 3,973 votes (44.2% vs. 44.5%) and other candidates with 117 votes (1.3% vs. 0.8%), among the 8,984 ballots cast by the borough's 11,275 registered voters, for a turnout of 79.7% (vs. 76.8% in Bergen County). In the 2004 presidential election, Democrat John Kerry received 4,539 votes (52.2% vs. 51.7% countywide), ahead of Republican George W. Bush with 4,030 votes (46.3% vs. 47.2%) and other candidates with 96 votes (1.1% vs. 0.7%), among the 8,698 ballots cast by the borough's 11,077 registered voters, for a turnout of 78.5% (vs. 76.9% in the whole county).

In the 2013 gubernatorial election, Republican Chris Christie received 56.6% of the vote (2,918 cast), ahead of Democrat Barbara Buono with 42.2% (2,174 votes), and other candidates with 1.1% (59 votes), among the 5,299 ballots cast by the borough's 10,653 registered voters (148 ballots were spoiled), for a turnout of 49.7%. In the 2009 gubernatorial election, Democrat Jon Corzine received 2,910 ballots cast (48.0% vs. 48.0% countywide), ahead of Republican Chris Christie with 2,642 votes (43.6% vs. 45.8%), Independent Chris Daggett with 421 votes (6.9% vs. 4.7%) and other candidates with 32 votes (0.5% vs. 0.5%), among the 6,062 ballots cast by the borough's 10,957 registered voters, yielding a 55.3% turnout (vs. 50.0% in the county).

Emergency services

Police

The Rutherford Police Department (RPD) provides emergency and protective services to the borough of Rutherford. The RPD consists of 40 officers. The current chief is John Russo who was appointed on March 26, 2013. The RPD responds to approximately 24,000 calls per year and conducts criminal investigations through its detective bureau.

The police department was originally organized in June 1879 as the Rutherford Protective and Detective Association.

Fire
The Rutherford Fire Department (RFD) is an all-volunteer fire department. The RFD was organized in May 1871 and consists of one Chief, one deputy chief and three assistant chiefs. There are five fire companies in three fire houses. Each company has a Captain and a Lieutenant. The department is staffed by 75 fully trained firefighters. The RFD utilizes three Engines, a Ladder truck, a Heavy Rescue, a Special Service Unit and two boats.

Two of Rutherford's firefighters—Edwin L. Ward in 1965 and Thomas E. Dunn in 1994—have died in the line of duty.

Ambulance

The Rutherford First Aid-Ambulance Corps is a volunteer service that was organized in 1949. The corp consists of 40 members that operate under the supervision of the Captain, First Lieutenant and Second Lieutenant. The corps provides basic life support, and is staffed primarily by certified Emergency Medical Technicians. CPR-trained drivers are also sometimes on duty. They operate three Type III ambulances.

Education
The Rutherford School District serves the borough's public school students in pre-kindergarten through twelfth grade. As of the 2018–19 school year, the district, comprised of five schools, had an enrollment of 2,652 students and 208.7 classroom teachers (on an FTE basis), for a student–teacher ratio of 12.7:1. Public education began in Rutherford prior to 1900, but the oldest school structure that is still standing is the former Park School, built in 1902. It is currently the home of the Rutherford borough hall, on Park Avenue. Schools in the district (with 2018–19 enrollment data from the National Center for Education Statistics) are 
Kindergarten Center (opened in 2014), 
Lincoln School (490 students; in grades Pre-K–3), 
Washington School (326; 1–3), 
Pierrepont School (595; 4–6), 
Union School (424; 7–8) and 
Rutherford High School (762; 9–12), built in 1922.

Rutherford formerly had three "neighborhood" schools for grades K–5 (Washington, Lincoln, and Sylvan) which fed into two "magnet" schools for 6–8. The magnet schools also served as elementary schools for their neighborhoods. Sylvan School was closed at the end of the 2004–2005 school year and has become a handicapped preschool, as well as office space for the special services department.

Public school students from the borough, and all of Bergen County, are eligible to attend the secondary education programs offered by the Bergen County Technical Schools, which include the Bergen County Academies in Hackensack, and the Bergen Tech campus in Teterboro or Paramus. The district offers programs on a shared-time or full-time basis, with admission based on a selective application process and tuition covered by the student's home school district.

St. Mary's Roman Catholic Church was established in Rutherford in the 1890s and opened a school shortly thereafter. The parish offers The Academy at Saint Mary for preschool through eighth grade and St. Mary High School, founded in 1929. Both schools are operated under the auspices of the Roman Catholic Archdiocese of Newark.

In 1942, Fairleigh Dickinson University was founded in Rutherford as a two-year college, anchored by the Iviswold Castle on Montross Avenue, which was built in the 1880s as a summer home by David B. Ivison. After FDU expanded to a four-year college and then to offering graduate programs, it acquired other, larger campuses, and eventually left Rutherford, offering the campus for sale due to financial difficulties. In the fall of 1997, the Rutherford campus was purchased by Felician College, an independent private Roman Catholic institution, which often has cultural and community events.

Transportation

Roads and highways

In the 1920s, the original Route 17 came through downtown Rutherford. Following the 1927 New Jersey State Highway renumbering, the new New Jersey Route 2 (later Route 17) was built in 1928, skirting the southeast edge of the borough, between the residential area and the New Jersey Meadowlands.

In 1948, a new bypass road along the southwest edge of the borough was built to bring traffic from Clifton and points west to the Lincoln Tunnel. The construction of the highway spur Route S3 (now Route 3) caused the demolition or relocation of numerous borough homes. In 2013, the Route 3 bridge over the Passaic River was replaced, and further improvements were made to the Rutherford section of the highway. The swing span of the Union Avenue Bridge over the Passaic was replaced in June 2002 as part of a $9.5 million project.

A short portion of the New Jersey Turnpike Western Spur (Interstate 95) passes through the southern section of Rutherford, but the closest interchange is located in neighboring East Rutherford at exit 16W.

Public transportation

Thanks to its easy access to New York City by rail, Rutherford became an early bedroom community. Following the initial wave of settlement in the late 19th century, an additional building boom occurred in the 1920s, when the majority of the borough's current housing stock was constructed.

Public Service Railway brought trolley lines into Rutherford around the start of the 20th century. The lines extended east to Jersey City, south to Newark, north to Hackensack, and west to Passaic. By the late 1940s, the trolleys were replaced by bus service.

After the opening of the Lincoln Tunnel in 1937, the Inter-City Bus Company began bus service direct from Paterson to New York City. The line was taken over by NJ Transit in the early 1980s.

Today, NJ Transit offers service to and from New York City's Port Authority Bus Terminal in Midtown Manhattan on several routes. The 163 offers rush hour service only, as Rutherford is not typically along its route. The 190 offers local service along Union Avenue and Orient Way. The 191, 192 and 195 routes all serve the portion of Rutherford that is adjacent to Route 3, as well as the portion of Route 17 that goes through Rutherford. The 76 bus provides service between Hackensack and Newark.

Rutherford's train station, which was built by the Erie Railroad in 1898, serves passengers on NJ Transit's Bergen County Line. Service is available to Suffern and various stations along Metro-North Railroad's Port Jervis Line, as well as all other Bergen County Line stations as Rutherford is the last stop before Secaucus Junction. Service is also provided to Hoboken Terminal with connections to Hudson–Bergen Light Rail, PATH, and NY Waterway service, and customers can connect at Secaucus for trains to New York Penn Station, Newark Liberty International Airport, and points west and south along the Morris & Essex Lines, North Jersey Coast Line, Northeast Corridor Line, and Montclair-Boonton Line. Access to the Raritan Valley Line is available at either Hoboken or at Newark Penn Station via Secaucus.

Notable people

People who were born in, residents of, or otherwise closely associated with Rutherford include:

 Alfred Andriola (1912–1983), cartoonist
 Maxwell Becton (1868–1951), co-founder of Becton Dickinson
 Erin Conaton (born 1970), former United States Under Secretary of Defense for Personnel and Readiness who had previously served as Under Secretary of the Air Force
 Howard Crook (born 1947), lyric tenor
 Wilhelmina Marguerita Crosson (1900–1991), educator and school administrator known for her innovative teaching methods who was one of the first African-American female schoolteachers in Boston
 Crowbar (born 1974), former professional wrestler
 George Dayton (1827–?), represented Bergen County in the New Jersey Senate from 1875 to 1877
 Fairleigh S. Dickinson (1866–1948), co-founder of Becton Dickinson and the named benefactor of Fairleigh Dickinson University
 Fairleigh Dickinson Jr. (1920–1996), member of the New Jersey Senate in 1968
 Kathleen Donovan (born 1952), County Executive of Bergen County, New Jersey who had previously been County Clerk and a member of the New Jersey General Assembly
 John Dull, folk music artist and promoter
 Jack Egbert (born 1983), MLB pitcher who played with the Chicago White Sox and New York Mets
 William H. J. Ely (1891–1942), district judge in New Jersey from 1924 to 1928 and represented Bergen County in the New Jersey Senate from 1932 to 1934
 Charles Evered (born 1964), playwright and director
 Fireman Ed (born 1959), New York Jets unofficial mascot
 Guy Leverne Fake (1879–1957), United States federal judge
 Beth Fowler (born 1940), actress
 Louis Frey Jr. (born 1934), Republican politician and former member of the US House of Representatives from Florida
 Deana Haggag (born 1987), President and CEO of United States Artists
 Kelly Hecking (born 1980), former backstroke and freestyle competition swimmer
 Art Hillhouse (1916–1980), professional basketball center who played two seasons in the Basketball Association of America for the Philadelphia Warriors
 Daniel Holsman, politician who represented Bergen County in the New Jersey Senate from 1863 to 1865
 Kim Kyung-jun (born 1987), violinist
 William Labov (born 1927), linguist
 John Cridland Latham (1888–1975), Medal of Honor recipient
 Thomas Le Clear (1818–1882), painter
 Robert Leckie (1920–2001), author
 John Marin (1870–1953), early modernist artist
 Pamela McCorduck (1940–2021), author who wrote about the history and philosophical significance of artificial intelligence, the future of engineering, and the role of women and technology
 Bernie McInerney (born 1936), character actor
 René A. Morel (1932–2011), luthier
 Charlie Morrow (born 1942), sound artist, composer, conceptualist and performer
 Richard Cooper Newick (1926–2013), multihull sailboat designer
 Peggy Noonan (born 1950), author of seven books and was Special Assistant to former President Ronald Reagan
 Thomas R. Pickering (born 1931), United States Ambassador to the United Nations from 1989 to 1992
 Kate Pierson (born 1948), singer with The B-52's
 Kerry Davis (Born 1970), recording artist; member of American all-female punk band Red Aunts and creator of Two Tears
 John Rutherfurd (1760–1840), United States Senator
 Calvin J. Spann (1924–2015), an original Tuskegee Airman and fighter pilot with the 100th Fighter Squadron of the 332nd Fighter Group
 Brian Kim Stefans (born 1969), poet
 Walter H. Stockmayer (1914–2004), chemist and university teacher
 Ellen R. Thompson (1928–2014), composer and music educator
 Daniel Van Winkle (1816–1886), developer who sold the land of the Rutherfurd Park Association and laid out the street grid pattern for Rutherford
 Winant Van Winkle (1879–1943), represented Bergen County in the New Jersey Senate from 1935 to 1940
 Walker Whiting Vick (1878–1926), an aide to Woodrow Wilson
 Siobhan Vivian (born 1979), novelist, editor and screenwriter
 Victor Victori (born 1943), portraitist, painter, sculptor and author
 Alexander Russell Webb (1846–1916), writer and publisher
 William Carlos Williams (1883–1963), poet
 Chris Wragge (born 1970), news anchor for WCBS-TV
 Ramy Youssef (born 1991), stand-up comedian and writer, who is best known for his role as Ramy Hassan on the Hulu comedy series Ramy

Professional athletes
 Brant Alyea (born 1940), baseball player who hit a home run on the first pitch he saw in the majors. and grew up in Rutherford
 Jim Blumenstock (1918–1963), fullback who played for the New York Giants in the 1947 season
 Deedy Crosson (1898–1973), Negro league shortstop in the 1920s
 Jim Garrett (born 1930), college football coach and professional football player
 Drew Gibbs (–2021), football coach who was head coach of the Kean University Cougars during the 1989 season and was a head coach at Ramapo High School
 Bill Hands (born 1940), former professional baseball pitcher who was a 20-game winner for the Chicago Cubs
 Frank Herrmann (born 1984), pitcher for the Cleveland Indians
 Bobby Jones (born 1972), former pitcher who played for the New York Mets
 Rodney Leinhardt (born 1970), professional wrestler
 Vin Mazzaro (born 1986), pitcher for the Kansas City Royals
 Da'Mon Merkerson (born 1989), football cornerback who played for the Arizona Rattlers of the Arena Football League
 Shaun O'Hara (born 1977), center for the New York Giants
 Pat Pacillo (born 1963), pitcher for Cincinnati Reds who debuted on May 23, 1987
 Leo Paquin (1910–1993), end for Fordham University as part of the 1936 line known as the "Seven Blocks of Granite"
 Percy Prince (1887–1973), English amateur footballer who played as a centre-forward for Southampton and Boscombe in the early 20th century
 Jim Spanarkel (born 1957), former professional basketball player for the Dallas Mavericks and the Philadelphia 76ers
 Michael Strahan (born 1971), former defensive end for the New York Giants
 Stan Walters (born 1948), former offensive tackle who played for the Cincinnati Bengals and the Philadelphia Eagles
 Corey Wootton (born 1987), defensive end for the Chicago Bears

References

Sources
 Municipal Incorporations of the State of New Jersey (according to Counties) prepared by the Division of Local Government, Department of the Treasury (New Jersey); December 1, 1958.
 Clayton, W. Woodford; and Nelson, William. History of Bergen and Passaic Counties, New Jersey, with Biographical Sketches of Many of its Pioneers and Prominent Men., Philadelphia: Everts and Peck, 1882.
 Harvey, Cornelius Burnham (ed.), Genealogical History of Hudson and Bergen Counties, New Jersey. New York: New Jersey Genealogical Publishing Co., 1900.
 Neumann, William. Rutherford, Arcadia Publishing, 2012. .
 Van Valen, James M. History of Bergen County, New Jersey. New York: New Jersey Publishing and Engraving Co., 1900.
 Westervelt, Frances A. (Frances Augusta), 1858–1942, History of Bergen County, New Jersey, 1630–1923, Lewis Historical Publishing Company, 1923.

External links

 Rutherford official website
 Rutherford School District
 
 School Data for the Rutherford School District, National Center for Education Statistics
 Rutherford Public Library
 Rutherford Fire Department
 Rutherford Volunteer Ambulance
 Rutherford Chamber of Commerce
 Williams Center for the Arts
 Felician College Rutherford campus
 Rutherford Downtown Partnership

 
1881 establishments in New Jersey
Borough form of New Jersey government
Boroughs in Bergen County, New Jersey
New Jersey Meadowlands District
Populated places established in 1881
New Jersey populated places on the Hackensack River